Smallpipes may refer to one of two kinds of bagpipes:

 The Northumbrian smallpipes
 The Scottish smallpipes

See also
 Border pipes, an instrument often confused with the Scottish smallpipes